Dryanovo (or Drjanovo) Municipality is a municipality (obshtina) in Gabrovo Province, North-central Bulgaria, located in the area of the so-called Fore-Balkan between Stara planina mountain and the Danubian Plain. It is named after its administrative centre - the town of Dryanovo.

The area is best known with the Dryanovo Monastery, situated close to the main town, and Bacho Kiro Cave.

Settlements 

Dryanovo Municipality includes the following 46 places (towns are shown in bold):

Demography 
The following table shows the change of the population during the last four decades.

Religion
According to the latest Bulgarian census of 2011, the religious composition, among those who answered the optional question on religious identification, was the following:

See also
Provinces of Bulgaria
Municipalities of Bulgaria
List of cities and towns in Bulgaria

References

External links
 Official website 

Municipalities in Gabrovo Province